Pärnu Concert Hall is a concert hall in Pärnu, Estonia. The hall is operated by Eesti Kontsert. The most solemn events in Pärnu are held there. For example, the Mayor and New Year's Eve celebrations.

The hall is also home for Pärnu Music School, Pärnu City Orchestra, music shop (Is Music team).

The hall was constructed in 2002. The hall was designed by Katrin Koov, Kaire Nõmm and Hanno Grossschmidt.

References

External links
 

Buildings and structures in Pärnu
Concert halls in Estonia